Game Over (Persian: بازی تمام شد) is 2013 Iranian animated short film directed by Seyed Mohsen Pourmohseni Shakib. It is the director's second short animation. Game Over currently has distribution with IndieFlix online video streaming service.

Plot 
In a war videogame, where even the sun is evil, four missiles fired from a military airplane decide to destroy the world. But fortunately the children who live inside that game find a way to stop them.

Festivals & TV

Festivals

2013
 National Student Film Festival - Iran 
 Watersprite: Cambridge International Student Film Festival - UK / Nominated For " Soundtrack Award " 
 International Motion Festival - Cyprus 
 Chilemonos International Animation Festival - Chile 
 International Student Film Festival - Mexico 
 Diversity In Animation Festival - Brasil 
 Open International Festival of Multimedia Art «Multimatograf» - Russia 
 Digital Graffiti Festival - USA 
 Vagrant Film Festival - Belarus 
 Seoul International Youth Film Festival - South Korea 
 Film Festival della Lessinia - Italy 
 Electric Lantern Festival - UK 
 Ecologico International Film Festival - Italy 
 No Gloss Film Festival - UK 
 48,40 Frames - Kurzfilmfestival - Austria 
 South Texas Underground Film Festival - USA 
 Tehran International Short Film Festival - Iran 
 Festival Internacional de Cine, Arte y Cultura - Paraguay 
 Isfahan International Festival of Films for Children & Young Adults - Iran 
 Northern Wave International Film Festival - Iceland 
 Simultan Festival - Romania 
 FreeNetWorld International Film Fest - Serbia 

2014

 Montréal International Children's Film Festival - Canada 
 Basij Honarmandan Provincial Film Festival - Guilan, Iran 
 Image Of The Year Festival - Iran 
 Athens Animation Festival - Greek 
 Golden Kuker: Sofia International Animation Film Festival - Bulgaria 
 Gothenburg Independent Film Festival - Sweden 
 Ordibehesht National Festival - Iran 
 BornShorts Film Festival - Denmark 
 Ekotopfilm - International Festival of Sustainable Development Films - Slovakia 
 YOUKI International Youth Media Festival - Austria
 Anim!Arte - International Student Animation Festival - Brazil 
 Karama Human Rights Film Festival - Jordan 

2015

 CSM International Children's Film Festival - India 
 Karama Gaza Human Rights Film Festival - Palestine 

TV

 IRIB 4 - Iran / Tehran
 Transit TV (Out The Window) - USA / Los Angeles 
 Namayesh TV - Iran / Tehran
 0 to 100 Television 
 Okto TV (Delete) - Asturia / Vienna 

Project

  Side Street Projects by ArtNight Pasadena(CA - USA)

References

External links 

Game Over on IndieFlix 

2013 animated films
2013 films
Iranian animated short films
2010s animated short films
2010s English-language films